The 2020 Eurohockey Indoor Championship II was the 7th edition of the tournament. It took take place from 17 to 19 January 2020 in Lucerne, Switzerland.

Qualified Teams

Sweden finished 3rd in the previous tournament, but did not take part in 2020. Instead Turkey, which as 7th placed team in 2018 were originally relegated, took part.

Format
The eight teams are split into two groups of four teams. The bottom two teams from pool A and B, play in a new group, pool C, against the teams they did not play against in the group stage. The top two teams from pool A and B, will also play in a new group, pool D, where they play the teams they did not play against in the group stage to determine the winner. All points from pools A and B will be taken over in pools C and D. The top two teams will be promoted to the 2022 Men's EuroHockey Indoor Nations Championship. The last two teams will be relegated to the 2022 Eurohockey Indoor Championship III.

Results
All times are local (UTC+1).

Preliminary round

Pool A

Pool B

Fifth to eighth place classification

Pool C
The points obtained in the preliminary round against the other team are taken over.

Pool D
The points obtained in the preliminary round against the other team are taken over.

Final standings

References

Men's EuroHockey Indoor Championship II
International indoor hockey competitions hosted by Switzerland
EuroHockey Indoor Nations Championship Men
Men 2
EuroHockey Indoor Nations Championship Men
Events in Lucerne